Schistura macrocephalus is a species of ray-finned fish. a stone loach, in the genus Schistura. It occurs in riffles over stony or gravel beds in streams with moderate to fast currents in the Mengla River in Yunnan, a tributary of the Mekong, and the Nam Youan in northern Laos, in turn a tributary of the Mengla.

References

M
Fish described in 2000